The Dark Haired Girl is a collection of essays, poems and letters by Philip K. Dick.  It was first published by Mark V. Ziesing in 1989.

Ziesing considers this the necessary companion volume to the complete collected works of the author. The letters, in particular, provide graphic evidence of Dick's all-too-human qualities within the context of his multiple relationships and/or marriages.

Contents

 Introduction, by Paul Williams
 "The Dark-Haired Girl"
 The Android and the Human
 poem
 The Evolution of a Vital Love
 letters, to Edgar Dick
 Man, Android and Machine
 letter, to Laura Dick
 "Goodbye, Vincent"

References

1988 books
Collections of letters
Essay collections
American poetry collections
Works by Philip K. Dick